The Rampart Stakes is an American Thoroughbred horse race run annually at Gulfstream Park in Hallandale Beach, Florida. A Listed event open to fillies and mares age four and up, it is contested over a distance of one and one-eighth miles on dirt.

Moon Glitter won the April 14, 1976 inaugural running of the Rampart Handicap which was run at a distance of seven furlongs for that year only.

Unrivaled Belle won the 2010 edition of the Rampart and went on to win that year's Breeders' Cup Ladies' Classic. 

As a result of a sponsorship arrangement, the Rampart was run as the Johnny Walker Black Classic in 1989 and 1990.
In 2021 the event was downgraded to a Listed event.

Records
Speed record:
 1:35.03 @ 1 mile: Letruska (2020)
 1:42.00 @ 1-1/16 miles: Nine Keys (1994)
 1:47.92 @ 1-1/8 miles: Allamerican Bertie (2003)

Most wins:
 * 2 - Awesome Maria (2011, 2012)

Most wins by a jockey:
 4 - Jerry Bailey (1992, 1993, 1999, 2004)
 4 - John Velazquez (2003, 2011, 2012, 2013)

Most wins by a trainer:
 5 - Todd Pletcher (2006, 2011, 2012, 2013, 2016)

Most wins by an owner:
 2 - Bertram W. Klein (2001, 2003)
 2 - E. Paul Robsham Stables (2011, 2012)

Winners
Gulfstream Park  

 † run February 21, 2015.
 Ŧ run December 12, 2015

References

Horse races in Florida
Flat horse races for fillies and mares
Mile category horse races for fillies and mares
Recurring sporting events established in 1976
Gulfstream Park